Goryeo missions to Japan represent a crucial aspect of the international relations of mutual Goryeo-Japanese contacts and communication, especially during the years in which there were no official contacts between the leaders of Goryeo and the leaders of Japan.

The unique nature of these bilateral diplomatic exchanges evolved from a conceptual framework developed by the Chinese. Gradually, the theoretical model would be modified. The changing model mirrors the evolution of a unique relationship between two neighboring states.

Goryeo diplomacy
The establishment of Goryeo in 918 was accompanied by break in bilateral relations with Japan. Taejo of Goryeo was focused on consolidation within the confines of his kingdom. Goryeo twice sent envoys to Japan, hoping to establish relations, but the venture was rebuffed by the Japanese.

In 1367, Kim Yong and Kim Il traveled as representative of Goryeo to the court of thee Ashikaga shogunate. On their return in 1368, Japanese monks Bonto and Bonryu from Tenryu-ji went with them. This was the first diplomatic exchange between Goryeo and Japan since the early 10th century.

Na Heung-yu represented Goryeo interests during his visit to Japan in 1375.

Goryeo envoy Jeong Mongju travelled to Japan in 1377; and the consequences of his efforts unfolded slowly.

The Joseon foreign policy would evolve from foundations established in the course Goryeo's foreign relations history.

List of Goryeo diplomatic envoys

 Kim Yong
 Kim Il
 Na Heung-yu
 Jeong Mongju (1337-1392)
 Hank Guk-ju
 Yi Gong-seung (1099-1183)

See also
 Goryeo missions to Imperial China
 Joseon diplomacy
 Toi invasion

Notes

References
 Kang, Jae-eun and Suzanne Lee. (2006). The Land of Scholars : Two Thousand Years of Korean Confucianism. Paramus, New Jersey: Homa & Sekey Books. ; OCLC 60931394
 Na, Jongwoo. "Relation with Japan in the Era of Koryo," International Journal of Korean History. Vol. 10 (December 2006): 71-92.
 Titsingh, Isaac, ed. (1834). [Siyun-sai Rin-siyo/Hayashi Gahō, 1652], Nipon o daï itsi ran; ou,  Annales des empereurs du Japon.  Paris: Oriental Translation Fund of Great Britain and Ireland.  OCLC  84067437
 Von Verschuer, Charlotte. "Japan’s Foreign Relations 1200 to 1392 A.D.: A Translation from Zenrin Kokuhoki," Monumenta Nipponica. Vol. 57, No. 4 (Winter 2002): 413-445.

Goryeo
Diplomacy